Jonathan Birch may refer to:
 Jonathan Birch (snooker player)
 Jonathan Birch (EIC captain)
 Jonathan Birch (translator)

See also
 John Birch (disambiguation)